Marietta may refer to:

Places in the United States 
Marietta, Jacksonville, Florida
Marietta, Georgia, the largest US city named Marietta
Marietta, Illinois
Marietta, Indiana
Marietta, Kansas
Marietta, Minnesota
Marietta, Mississippi
Marietta, Nevada
Marietta, New York
Marietta, North Carolina
Marietta, Ohio
Marietta, Oklahoma
Marietta, Adair County, Oklahoma
Marietta, Pennsylvania
Marietta, South Carolina
Marietta, Texas
Marietta, Wisconsin
Marietta Township (disambiguation)

People with the given name 
Marietta Alboni (1823–1894), Italian opera singer
Marietta Blau (1894–1970), Austrian physicist
Marietta Bones (1842–1901), American suffragist, social reformer, philanthropist
Marietta Canty (1905–1986), American actress
Marietta Stanley Case (1845–1900), American author and temperance advocate
Marietta Chrousala (born 1983), Greek fashion model and television presenter
Marietta de Patras (died 1503), Greek mistress of King John II of Cyprus
Marietta de Pourbaix-Lundin (born 1951), Swedish politician
Marietta DePrima (born 1964), American actress
Marietta Farrell (born 1951), Irish politician
Marietta Gazzaniga (1824–1884), Italian operatic soprano
Marietta Giannakou (born 1951), Greek politician
Marietta Gillman (born 1955), American canoer
Marietta Holley (1836–1926), American humorist
Marietta Johnson (1864–1938), American educational reformer
Marietta Judah (1812-1883), American stage actress
Marietta Karamanli (born 1964), French politician
Marietta LeBreton (1936–2009), American historian
Marietta Marcolini (c. 1780–1855), Italian operatic contralto
Marietta Marich (1930–2017), American actress
Marietta Martin (1902–1944), French writer and Resistance worker
Marietta Pallis (1882–1963), British botanist
Marietta Piccolomini (1834–1899), Italian soprano
Marietta Piekenbrock (born 1964), German artistic curator
Marietta Roberts (born 1943), Canadian politician
Marietta Robusti (1560–1590), Venetian painter
Marietta Sacchi, Italian operatic soprano 
Marietta Shaginyan (1888–1982), Russian writer and public activist
Marietta Slomka (born 1969), German journalist
Marietta Stow (1830–1902), American suffragist
Marietta Peabody Tree (1917–1991), American socialite and political reporter
Marietta Waters (born 1960), American singer
Marietta Žigalová (born 1968), Slovak female fitness competitor

Ships
Marietta-class monitor, U.S. ships during the Civil War
, a number of ships with this or similar names
USS Marietta, several ships in the U.S. Navy

Other uses
2144 Marietta, a main-belt asteroid, named for Marietta Shaginyan
Battle of Marietta (1864)
Marietta biscuit, the name in Ireland for the Marie biscuit
Marietta City Schools (disambiguation)
Marietta College, Ohio 
Marietta Confederate Cemetery, Georgia
Marietta (Glenn Dale, Maryland), a historic home
Marietta High School (disambiguation)
Marietta Historic District (disambiguation)
Marietta Ice Center, Atlanta, Georgia
Marietta National Cemetery, Georgia
Marietta Parkway, Marietta, Georgia
Marietta Square, park and city center in Marietta, Georgia
Marietta Storm, World Basketball Association franchise based in Marietta, Georgia
Marietta Subdivision, railroad line owned and operated by CSX Transportation
Marietta (band), a band from Philadelphia, Pennsylvania

See also
Marietta-Alderwood, Washington
Martin Marietta
Naughty Marietta (disambiguation)